Lake Kristi is a private water skiing-site located in Greenville, North Carolina containing two artificial lakes. The lake is named after former water skiing champion Kristi Overton Johnson. Although specifically designed for water skiing, Lake Kristi is also used as a cross country course.

Description
The lakes are described as championship calibre.

Location
Lake Kristi, located eight miles from Greenville, is built in Parker Overton's backyard, originally built for his daughter, Kristi Overton Johnson at the age of 12. The lake was built as the nearest location for water skiing at the time was a river over 1 hour away.

Usage

The lake previously hosted the 1996 and 1997 U.S. Open Water Ski Championships. Lake Kristi hosted Greenville's first Pro Tour event as part of the U.S. Open. In 1989, Lake Kristi was listed as one of over 150 supersites in the United States, with only three of these sites being in North Carolina.

Aside from being used as a tournament site, Kristi was also used as test site for Overton's marine business.

References

Artificial lakes of the United States
Reservoirs in North Carolina
Greenville, North Carolina